Just Eat Takeaway.com N.V. (formerly Takeaway.com; founded as Thuisbezorgd.nl) is a Dutch multinational online food ordering and delivery company, formed from the merger of London-based Just Eat and Amsterdam-based Takeaway.com in 2020. It is the parent company of food delivery brands including Takeaway.com, Lieferando, Thuisbezorgd.nl, Pyszne.pl, 10bis in Israel, and those acquired from Just Eat, including SkipTheDishes and Menulog. Since the merger, the company has acquired Grubhub in the United States and Bistro.sk. Just Eat Takeaway operate various food ordering and delivery platforms in twenty countries, where customers can order food online from restaurants’ menus, and have it delivered by restaurant or company couriers directly to their home or workplace using an app or website. The company also partners with IFood in Brazil and Colombia. 

Following clearance by the United Kingdom's Competition and Markets Authority on 22 April 2020, Takeaway.com merged with UK-based food delivery service Just Eat, in February 2020, with Takeaway.com acquiring all of Just Eat's shares in issue. It is listed on Euronext Amsterdam and the London Stock Exchange. The company announced their bid for Grubhub in June 2020 and completed the deal in 2021, however, on 20 April 2022 the company announced they are considering selling Grubhub, which has only been in their ownership for "barely a year".

History

Takeaway.com was created by Jitse Groen in 2000 after he had a difficult time ordering food online from local restaurants. Initially, Groen wanted to deliver all kinds of consumer goods; however, he noticed that food deliveries had the most demand, and decided to make this the company's primary focus.
In 2002, co-founder Ruben Eilander quit Takeaway because the business was growing slowly. According to Groen, in these early years, he was relying on his student loans to keep himself financially afloat. Thanks to broadband internet becoming mainstream around 2003, the business started growing massively, and Groen decided to quit his studies to focus on the company.

It began accepting Bitcoin in November 2013. It also launched its new logo in all of their countries. In August that year, it stopped doing business in the UK, selling its customer portfolio to rival Just Eat.

In 2017, Pizza.be rebranded to Takeaway.com in Belgium. In 2018, the commission for using the platform was increased from 12% to 13%.

In July 2019, Takeaway.com announced proposals to take over Just Eat. In January 2020, 80.4% of Just Eat shareholders approved Takeaway.com's acquisition deal. Although Just Eat became a subsidiary of Takeaway.com on 3 February 2020, the British Competition and Markets Authority ordered on the following day that no integration should take place and that the brands should be kept separate until their investigation is completed.

On 22 April 2020, the Competition and Markets Authority announced that it was unconditionally approving Just Eat's merger with Takeaway.com, following an investigation. On 11 June, the company announced that it would acquire, in an all-stock transaction, US-based Grubhub—valuing the deal at $7.3 billion.

In July 2020, the company was reported to be in talks with Prosus to sell its 33% stake, inherited from Just Eat, in Brazilian food delivery company iFood, which operates in Brazil and Colombia. The company has a partnership with iFood in these two countries.

On 22 March 2021, Just Eat Takeaway.com became the sponsors of the UEFA men's club and women's competitions starting in the 2021-24 cycle after being awarded the first-ever sponsorship contract for the UEFA Euro 2020.

On 16 July 2021, the company announced it would acquire Slovakian market leader Bistro.sk, with the acquisition completed in October 2021.

On 1 April 2022, the company left Norway and Portugal after announcing its departure in March.

On 20 April 2022, Just Eat Takeaway announced it was considering a full or partial sale of Grubhub, which it fully completed its purchase of in 2021. The consideration is based on investor pressure and decreased profits, with Just Eat Takeaway's entire market capitalisation lower than the price for Grubhub.

On 1 June 2022, the company discontinued its Takeaway.com operations in Romania.

On 19 August 2022, Just Eat Takeaway.com sold its 33% stake in iFood to Prosus (via Movile) for €1.8 billion.

Operations
The company operates under different brand names in different countries.

See also
 List of websites about food and drink

Notes

References

Online retailers of the Netherlands
Retail companies established in 2000
Transport companies established in 2000
Internet properties established in 2000
Online food ordering
Companies listed on Euronext Amsterdam
Companies listed on the London Stock Exchange
Companies listed on the Nasdaq
Food and drink companies based in Amsterdam
Dutch companies established in 2000
Online companies of the Netherlands